Dilshodbek Ruzmetov (born 12 March 1999) is an Uzbek professional boxer. As an amateur, Ruzmetov won a gold medal at the 2021 Asian Championships and a silver medal at the 2019 World Championships. Ruzmetov also competed at the 2020 Summer Olympics.

Amateur career

Olympic result
Tokyo 2020
Round of 32: Defeated Emmett Brennan (Republic of Ireland) 5–0
Round of 16: Defeated by Loren Alfonso (Azerbaijan) 4–1

World Championships result
Yekaterinburg 2019
First round: Defeated Shinebayar Narmandakh (Mongolia) 5–0
Second round: Defeated Peter Pita (Democratic Republic of the Congo) 5–0
Third round: Defeated Andrei Aradoaie (Romania) 5–0
Quarter-finals: Defeated Loren Alfonso (Azerbaijan) 3–2
Semi-finals: Defeated Benjamin Whittaker (England) 5–0
Final: Defeated by Bekzad Nurdauletov (Kazakhstan) 5–0

Professional boxing record

References

External links

1999 births
Living people
Uzbekistani male boxers
Light-heavyweight boxers
AIBA World Boxing Championships medalists
People from Xorazm Region
Boxers at the 2020 Summer Olympics
Olympic boxers of Uzbekistan
21st-century Uzbekistani people